Dolichoderus tristis is a species of ant in the genus Dolichoderus. Described by William M. Mann in 1916, the species is endemic to Brazil and Peru.

References

Dolichoderus
Hymenoptera of South America
Insects described in 1993